Joanna Bruck is an archaeologist and academic, who is a specialist on Bronze Age Britain and Ireland. Since 2020, she has been Professor of Archaeology and Head of the School of Archaeology at University College Dublin. She was previously Professor of Archaeology at the University of Bristol between 2013 and 2020.

Education 
She studied for a BA and PhD at the University of Cambridge. Her thesis, awarded in 1997, was titled "The early-middle bronze age transition in Wessex, Sussex and the Thames Valley", supervised by Marie Louise Stig Sorensen.

Career 
Bruck was a junior research fellow at Clare Hall, Cambridge from 1997 to 1999. She then moved to University College Dublin, where she had been appointed a lecturer in archaeology in 1999. By 2006, she had been promoted to senior lecturer. In 2013, she moved to the University of Bristol where she had been appointed Reader in Archaeology. She was promoted to Professor of Archaeology at Bristol, before returning University College Dublin as Professor of Archaeology and Head of the School of Archaeology in 2020.

Her research themes have included the body and personhood, landscape, domestic architecture, material culture and deposition. More recent work has included nineteenth and twentieth century Ireland, including the 1916 Rising and the archaeology of internment.

She has edited several volumes, including  Making Places in the Prehistoric World: Themes in Settlement Archaeology (1999) and Bronze Age Landscapes: Tradition and Transformation (2002).

She has received research funding form the British Academy. In 1999 she co-established the Bronze Age Forum with Stuart Needham. She was previously editor of PAST, the newsletter of the Prehistoric Society. Bruck is on the editorial board of Archaeological Dialogues and vice president of the Prehistoric Society.

Selected publications 

 Bruck, J. 2019. Personifying Prehistory. Relational Ontologies in Bronze Age Britain and Ireland. Oxford: OUP.
 Bruck, J. (ed.) 2002. Bronze Age Landscapes: Tradition and Transformation. Oxford: Oxbow.

Articles 
 Brück, J. 1995. A place for the dead: the role of human remains in Late Bronze Age Britain. Proceedings of the Prehistoric Society 61
 Brück, J. 1999. Ritual and rationality: some problems of interpretation in European archaeology. European Journal of Archaeology 2.3: 313-344.
 Brück, J. 2001. Monuments, power and personhood in the British Neolithic. Journal of the Royal Anthropological Institute 7.4: 649-667.
 Brück, J. 2004. Material metaphors: the relational construction of identity in Early Bronze Age burials in Ireland and Britain. Journal of Social Archaeology 4.3: 307-333.
 Brück, J. 2005. Experiencing the past? The development of a phenomenological archaeology in British prehistory. Archaeological Dialogues 12(1), 45-72.

References 

Alumni of the University of Cambridge
Academics of the University of Bristol
British archaeologists
British women archaeologists